Hydrothassa marginella is a Europe species of leaf beetles in the family Chrysomelinae

Description
Hydrothassa marginella grows to 3.4 - 4.5mm in length and are dark metallic blue and orange-yellow in colour. The pronotum is coloured yellowish with lateral margins. It may be confused with H. glabra or H. hannoveriana.

Habitat
Hydrothassa marginella is a common and widespread species, active between the months of mid-April and August. It has various host plants, especially buttercups. Adults overwinter in grass tussocks.

Distribution
Hydrothassa marginella is prevalent in central and northern Europe.

References

External links

 List of references for Hydrothassa marginella (L., 1758) at Biodiversity Heritage Library
 

Beetles of Europe
Beetles described in 1758
Chrysomelinae
Taxa named by Carl Linnaeus